Scott Brian Autrey (born July 9, 1953) is an American former professional motorcycle speedway rider. In 1976, he became the first American rider to reach a speedway world final since Ernie Roccio in 1951.



Motorcycle racing career
Born in Maywood, California, Autrey began his motorcycle racing career in 1964 by competing in flat track racing at Perris Auto Speedway. In 1968, he had a major off-road racing victory when he won the 100cc class in the Rosarita Grand Prix in Mexico. He also competed in road racing, placing second in the novice road race class held before the 1971 Daytona 200.

In 1972, Autrey finished second in the United States Speedway National Championship. After witnessing the 1972 Individual Speedway World Championship in Wembley Stadium, he made the decision to concentrate fully on speedway racing. In 1973, Autrey was recommended by Ivan Mauger to join the Exeter Falcons – with whom he won the British League title in 1974 – Swindon Robins, and the Poole Pirates in England.

He finished 3rd in the 1978 World Speedway Championship at Wembley and won the World Team Cup with the USA in 1982. He retired from the sport at the end of 1982 at a relatively young age.

Automobile racing career
After his two-wheeled racing career ended, he became a NASCAR driver who made one Nextel Cup start. He competed in the Winston West Series full-time. That Cup race came in 1985, when Autrey started 29th in the forty-one car field, where he dropped out late with transmission issues. He finished 34th as a result.

World Final appearances

Individual World Championship
 1976 -  Chorzów, Silesian Stadium - 9th - 7pts
 1978 -  London, Wembley Stadium - 3rd - 11pts + 3pts

World Team Cup
 1980 -  Wrocław, Olympic Stadium (with Bruce Penhall / Dennis Sigalos / Bobby Schwartz / Ron Preston) - 2nd - 29pts (9)
 1982 -  London, White City Stadium (with Bruce Penhall / Bobby Schwartz / Kelly Moran / Shawn Moran) - Winner - 34pts (0)

World Longtrack Final
 1978  Mühldorf (11th) 9pts

References

External links
Scott Autrey NASCAR Stats

1953 births
Living people
People from Maywood, California
American motorcycle racers
American speedway riders
Exeter Falcons riders
Poole Pirates riders
Swindon Robins riders
NASCAR drivers
Racing drivers from California
Racing drivers from Los Angeles
Individual Speedway Long Track World Championship riders